Isopogon inconspicuus  is a plant in the family Proteaceae and is endemic to the southwest of Western Australia. It is a small shrub with pinnate leaves with cylindrical leaflets, and pink to purple flowers covered with grey hairs.

Description

Taxonomy and naming
This isopogon was first formally described in 1855 by Carl Meissner in Hooker's Journal of Botany and Kew Garden Miscellany and given the name Petrophile inconspicua from specimens collected by James Drummond. In 1995, Donald Bruce Foreman changed the name to Isopogon inconspicuus in Flora of Australia.

Distribution and habitat
Isopogon inconspicuus grows in heath and shrubland on sandplains between  Dandaragan and Eneabba.

References

inconspicuus
Eudicots of Western Australia
Plants described in 1855
Taxa named by Carl Meissner